Midnight Menace may refer to:
 Midnight Menace (1937 film), a British thriller film
 Midnight Menace (1946 film), a short American musical film